NGC 425 is a spiral galaxy in the constellation of Andromeda. It was discovered on 29 October 1866 by Truman Safford.

References

External links 
 

Andromeda (constellation)
Astronomical objects discovered in 1866
Discoveries by Truman Safford
0425
Spiral galaxies
004379
000758